Ganzhou Huangjin Airport  is an airport serving the city of Ganzhou in Jiangxi Province, China.  The airport is located in the town of Fenggang in Nankang District of Ganzhou.  It is 16 kilometers from the city center of Ganzhou.

The airport was built with a total investment of 520 million yuan to replace the old airport of the same name.  After the last flight departed the old airport on 25 March 2008, all services were transferred to the new airport, which officially opened the next day.

Facilities

The airport has a runway that is 2,600 meters long, 45 meters wide, and 34 centimeters thick (class 4C, expandable to 4D).  It also has 7,186 square-meter terminal building and a 36,000 square-meter aircraft parking lot with five parking aprons.  It is designed with an annual handling capacity of 500,000 passengers, 3,000 tons of cargo, and 6,200 aircraft movements.  The airport occupies an area of 2668 mu (178 ha).

Airlines and destinations

See also
Ganzhou Huangjin Airport (former)
List of airports in China
List of the busiest airports in China

References

Airports in Jiangxi
Airports established in 2008
2008 establishments in China
Ganzhou